This is a list of rivers in Algeria. This list is arranged west to east by drainage basin, with respective tributaries indented under each larger stream's name.

Atlantic Ocean
Draa River

Mediterranean Sea
Tafna River
Isser River
Hammam River (Habra River) (Macta River)
Sig River
Mebtouh River
Chelif River
Mina River
Djediouia River
Ghiou River (Riou River)
Sly River
Tsighaout River
Fodda River
Rouina River (Zeddine River)
Ebda River
Massine River
Deurdeur River
Akoum River
Nahr Ouassel River
Touil River
Mazafran River
Harrach River
Reghaïa River
Boudouaou River
Isser River
Malah River
Meraldene River
Sebaou River
Soummam River
Amassine River
Bou Sellam River
Sahel River
Kebîr River (Jijel)
Enndja River
Rummel River
Guebli River
Safsâf River
Kebir River (Skikda)
Seybouse River
Cherf River
Kebîr River (El Taref)
Medjerda River
Mellègue River
Ksob River (Chabro)
Meskiana River

Sahara

Sebkhet el Melah
Oued Saoura
Oued Zousfana
Oued Guir
Oued Béchar
Oued Messaoud
Oued Tilia

Chott Ech Chergui
Oued el Korima

Chott el Hodna
Oued Leham

Chott Melrhir
Oued Djedi
Oued Zeribet
Oued el Arab
Oued el Mitta
Oued Ittel
Oued el Kherouf

Sebkhet Safioune
Oued Zegrir
Oued Mya

Sebkha Mekerrhane
Oued Tsaret
Asouf Mellene
Oued Tasendjanet

Aharrar
Oued Igharghar
Oued Tafassasset
Oued Ti-n-Tarabine
Oued Igharghar
Oued Zazir
Oued Ti-n-Amzi
Oued Tamanrasset

Grand Erg Occidental
Oued Namous

References
Rand McNally, The New International Atlas, 1993.
Defense Mapping Agency, 1981
Defense Mapping Agency, 1981
 GEOnet Names Server

Algeria
Rivers